Kevin Van Impe (born 19 April 1981 in Aalst, East Flanders) is a retired Belgian professional road bicycle racer. His father  is former cyclist Frank Van Impe, and his uncle is Lucien Van Impe, one of the greatest climbers in cycling history and winner of the 1976 Tour de France.

A routine out of competition drugs test performed on Van Impe caused controversy in March 2008. Van Impe was asked to give a sample for testing whilst at a crematorium making funeral arrangements for his deceased son, and was warned that failure to provide a sample would count as a refusal to give a sample, for which sanctions apply. Professional cyclists racing in the Paris–Nice and Tirreno–Adriatico performed demonstrations over the lack of respect shown to Van Impe.

Van Impe retired in March 2012, having only joined the  team in January of that year.

Major results

1999
 1st  Time trial, National Under–19 Road Championships
2000
 3rd Time trial, National Under–23 Road Championships
2002
 1st GP Zele
2003
 1st Stage 1 Rheinland-Pfalz Rundfahrt
2004
 8th Overall Circuit Franco-Belge
 9th Overall Tour of Britain
 9th Brussel–Ingooigem
2005
 1st Omloop van het Houtland
 2nd Road race, National Road Championships
 2nd Kuurne–Brussels–Kuurne
 6th Kampioenschap van Vlaanderen
2006
 1st  Overall Circuit Franco-Belge
1st  Young rider classification
1st Stage 1
 9th Kuurne–Brussels–Kuurne
 9th Halle–Ingooigem
2007
 9th Paris–Roubaix
2009
 1st Dwars door Vlaanderen

References

External links 
 Official website 

1981 births
Living people
Sportspeople from Aalst, Belgium
Cyclists from East Flanders
Belgian male cyclists